Jamming (or variants) may refer to:

General
 Jamming (knot), the tendency of knots to become difficult to untie
 Interfering with communications or surveillance:
 Radio jamming
 Radar jamming and deception
 Mobile phone jammer
 Echolocation jamming
 Radio-controlled improvised explosive device jamming, a counter-IED technique 
 Jamming (physics), an apparent change of physical state
 Jamming (rock climbing), a rock climbing technique
Jamming (weapon), a firearm malfunction

TV and radio
 Culture jamming, criticizing mass media through its own methods
 [[Jammin' (radio programme)|Jammin''' (radio programme)]], BBC Radio 2 musical comedy show that aired since 2001
 Jammin, original version of TV series Kickin' It with Byron Allen 1992
 Jammin (2006 TV series), Sí TV reality television series that aired from 2006 to 2008

Music and dance
 Jammin, an alias of DJ Zinc
 Jam session, a semi-improvised rock or jazz performance
 Jamming (dance), cheered show-offs during social dancing
 Jamming!, a UK music fanzine of the 1970s–80s created by Tony FletcherJamming'', dancehall reggae album by Frankie Paul, 1991
 "Jammin'" (Andrews Sisters song), debut hit song of the Andrews Sisters, 1937
 "Jamming" (song), by Bob Marley, 1977
 "Master Blaster (Jammin')", a song by Stevie Wonder, 1980

See also
 Jam (disambiguation)
 Jammer (disambiguation)